The Algerian Super Cup, is an Algerian football competition, held as a game between the reigning champions of the Algerian League and the Algerian Cup. The first edition was held in 1981 and then again in 1992, 1994 and 1995 before being scrapped. The game returned in 2006 but would be scrapped again after the 2007 edition, returning once again in 2013.

The current holders are CR Belouizdad, who beat USM Alger in the 2019 final, played in November 2020. MC Alger is the most successful club in the competition, having won the trophy three times.

History 

The Algerian Super Cup is a recent competition of Algerian football. This is an event that takes place on a single meeting between the winners of the Algerian Cup and Algerian Ligue Professionnelle 1. Usually the meeting is domiciled in Stade 5 Juillet 1962 of Algiers, the national stadium of Algeria.

In 1973, a week before the start of the championship, a match was organized between the JS Kabylie reigning Algerian champion and the MC Alger winner of the Algerian Cup. Algeria at the Stade du 5-Juillet-1962. The JSK won this gala match by 3 goals to 2. Although the meeting was primarily friendly, the idea of a "Super Cup" type competition had just germinated in the minds of Algerian football leaders.

By aligning with other football nations, the Algerian Football Federation organized in 1981, a new competition called "Super Cup" during which the national champion and Cup winner in Algeria the same season clashed at Algiers to obtain this 1 trophy. This first edition was marked by the victory of RC Kouba 1st winner of this competition with a score of 3 goals to 1 facing the USM Alger. This competition will be played actively until 1995 until its latest edition with a different winner every year. However, the  Super  had not the popular fervor as expected given the context of social and political crisis in the country.

In 2006 a wealthy sponsor, the company "Ring", the official representative of Nokia in Algeria had the idea to bring up to date the competition. Given the sponsorship agreements between the two partners, FAF Ring and to promote this challenge on a contract period of 4 years, the meeting was to be held each 1 November after season for obtaining 2 titles. This year was not chosen at random, as the supporters of the two titles that are Algerian Cup and Algerian Ligue Professionnelle 1 were respectively MC Algiers and JS Kabylie, are the two most famous and most successful clubs of the Algerian football. However, it was agreed that this would always be the FAF that would organize the competition and "Ring" unique sponsor.

Finally after the year 2007, the test was again abandoned for various reasons. Editing 2008, which was to place between the two clubs into Kabyle national titles such as the JS Kabylie and JSM Bejaia was canceled due to the Kabyle but normally the package declaration the trophy returns to bougiotes despite the vain protests interested but it did not change anything.
In 2009 the ES Sétif defending champions and CR Belouizdad Cup winner met the same fate because of the busy schedule of the FAF which priority was focused on possible qualification of the national team for World Cup in South Africa.

It was not until the year 2013 to review the competition again but this time co-organized by the Federation and league professional football, with the participants as ES Sétif and USM Alger.

Winners 
Results:

Champions' Trophy (unofficial)

Algerian Super Cup

Performance by club

Venues

Winning managers

See also
 Algerian Ligue Professionnelle 1
 Algerian Cup

Notes

References

 
Super
Recurring sporting events established in 1981
1981 establishments in Algeria